Maycon is a given name. It may refer to:

 Maycon (footballer, born 1977), Andréia dos Santos, Brazilian women's football midfielder
 Maycon (footballer, born 1985), Maycon Vieira de Freitas, Brazilian football defensive midfielder
 Maycon (footballer, born 1986), Maycon Calvalho Inez, Brazilian football striker
 Maycon Calijuri (born 1986), Brazilian football forward
 Maycon (footballer, born 1994), Maycon Lucas Nogueira Mansano, Brazilian football midfielder
 Maycon Douglas (born 1996), Brazilian football forward
 Maycon (footballer, born 1997), Maycon de Andrade Barberan, Brazilian football midfielder
 Maycon Cleiton (born 1998), Brazilian football goalkeeper

See also
 Maicon
 Maykon (born 1985), Maykon Daniel Elias Araújo, Brazilian football midfielder